Geoffrey Twentyman (19 January 1930 – 16 February 2004) was an English footballer who is mainly remembered for his links with Liverpool Football Club as both a player and as chief scout.

Player

Born in Brampton, Cumberland, the left-half played for Swift Rovers as an amateur and Carlisle United.

He was spotted by Don Welsh who signed him for Liverpool in December 1953 for £10,000, he made his debut the same month on the 19th in a league match against arch rivals Manchester United at Old Trafford. United won 5–1. His first goal came almost a year later on 9 November 1954 in a 2–1 win over Hull City in a Second Division match at Anfield.

Twentyman's signature couldn't prevent them from being relegated by the end of his first season at the club. All of Twentyman's Liverpool appearances were during the days when they struggled to get out of the Second Division, even though they were finishing consistently just outside the promotion places. Twentyman featured in 184 matches scoring 19 goals before leaving Liverpool.

He went on to become player/manager of Irish side Ballymena United. Ironically he left the Reds just 9 months before the arrival of his former boss, Shankly. After his spell at Ballymena, Twentyman returned to play for Carlisle for a second time, he also went on to represent Morecambe and Penrith.

Management and scouting

After his retirement Twentyman had a short four-month spell as the boss of Hartlepool United before being replaced by Brian Clough. He was then invited by Shankly to return to Liverpool in 1967 to join The Boot Room in the role of chief scout. It was in this role that Twentyman made his name at Liverpool discovering such talents as Ian Rush at Chester (£300,000), who became captain and ended up Liverpool's all-time record goalscorer; Phil Neal at Northampton Town (£66,000), who became skipper and won the most medals by a single player in the Reds history; and Alan Hansen at Partick Thistle (£100,000), who also became club captain and won numerous domestic and UEFA honours to name but 3. Twentyman eventually spent 21 years in the role working for the likes of Bob Paisley, Joe Fagan and Kenny Dalglish, he finally left in 1986.

He went on to become Chief Scout for Rangers when former Reds Captain Graeme Souness came calling.

Geoff Twentyman died in Southport on 16 February 2004, aged 74.

External links
Official player profile at Liverpoolfc.tv
Player profile at LFChistory.net

1930 births
2004 deaths
English footballers
English football managers
Carlisle United F.C. players
Liverpool F.C. players
Liverpool F.C. non-playing staff
Rangers F.C. non-playing staff
Morecambe F.C. players
Morecambe F.C. managers
Hartlepool United F.C. managers
Footballers from Cumbria
NIFL Premiership players
Penrith F.C. players
Ballymena United F.C. players
Ballymena United F.C. managers
Association football defenders
NIFL Premiership managers
People from Brampton, Carlisle